A military artificial intelligence arms race is a competition or arms race between two or more states to have their military forces equipped with the best artificial intelligence (AI). Since the mid-2010s many analysts have noted the emergence of such a global arms race, the AI arms race, between great powers for better military AI, coinciding with and being driven by the increasing geopolitical and military tensions of what some have called a Second Cold War.
The context of the AI arms race is the AI Cold War narrative, in which tensions between the US and China lead to a cold war waged in the area of  technology. The newest weapons will not be the biggest bombs, tanks or missiles but AI-powered applications and devices which will be used to wage and win wars

Terminology 
The AI arms race is the race by global powers to develop and deploy lethal autonomous weapons systems (LAWS), also known as "slaughterbots" or "killer robots." These are weapons systems that use artificial intelligence (AI) to identify, select, and kill human targets without human intervention. More broadly, any competition for superior AI is sometimes framed as an "arms race". A quest for military AI dominance overlaps with a quest for dominance in other sectors, especially as a country pursues both economic and military advantages.

Risks 
Stephen Cave of the Leverhulme Centre argues that the risks of an AI race are threefold, each with potential geopolitical implications. The first risk is that even if there was no race the terminology surrounding the race is dangerous. The rhetoric around the AI race and the importance of being first does not encourage the type of thoughtful deliberation with stake holders required to produce AI technology that is the most broadly beneficial to society and could self-fulfillingly induce a race.

The second risk is the AI race itself, whether or not the race is won by any one group. Due to the rhetoric and perceived advantage of being the first to develop advanced AI technology, there emerges strong incentives to cut corners on safety considerations which might leave out important aspects such as bias and fairness. In particular, the perception of another team being on the brink of a break through encourages other teams to take short cuts and deploy an AI system that is not ready, which can be harmful to others and the group possessing the AI system. As Paul Scharre warns in Foreign Policy, "For each country, the real danger is not that it will fall behind its competitors in AI but that the perception of a race will prompt everyone to rush to deploy unsafe AI systems. In their desire to win, countries risk endangering themselves just as much as their opponents." Nick Bostrom and others developed a model that provides further evidence of such. The model found that a team possessing more information about other teams' capabilities caused more risk-taking and short cuts in their development of AI systems. Furthermore, the greater the enmity between teams, the greater the risk of ignoring precautions and leading to an AI disaster. Another danger of an AI arms race is the risk of losing control of the AI systems and the risk is compounded in the case of a race to artificial general intelligence, which Cave noted may present an existential risk.

The third risk of an AI arms race is if the race is actually won by one group. An example of this risk is the consolidation of power and technological advantage in the hands of one group. If one group achieves superior AI technology "[i]t is only reasonable to conclude that AI-enabled capabilities could be used to threaten our critical infrastructure, amplify disinformation campaigns, and wage war.":1

Arms-race terminology is also sometimes used in the context of competition for economic dominance and "soft power"; for example, the November 2019 'Interim Report' of the United States' National Security Commission on Artificial Intelligence, while stressing the role of diplomacy in engaging with China and Russia, adopts the language of a competitive arms race. It states that US military-technological superiority is vital to the existing world order:11 and stresses the ongoing US militarization of AI, together with militarization of AI by China and Russia, is for geopolitical purposes.:1-2

Stances toward military artificial intelligence

Russia 

Russian General Viktor Bondarev, commander-in-chief of the Russian air force, stated that as early as February 2017, Russia was working on AI-guided missiles that could decide to switch targets mid-flight. Russia's Military Industrial Committee has approved plans to derive 30 percent of Russia's combat power from remote controlled and AI-enabled robotic platforms by 2030. Reports by state-sponsored Russian media on potential military uses of AI increased in mid-2017. In May 2017, the CEO of Russia's Kronstadt Group, a defense contractor, stated that "there already exist completely autonomous AI operation systems that provide the means for UAV clusters, when they fulfill missions autonomously, sharing tasks between them, and interact", and that it is inevitable that "swarms of drones" will one day fly over combat zones. Russia has been testing several autonomous and semi-autonomous combat systems, such as Kalashnikov's "neural net" combat module, with a machine gun, a camera, and an AI that its makers claim can make its own targeting judgements without human intervention.

In September 2017, during a National Knowledge Day address to over a million students in 16,000 Russian schools, Russian President Vladimir Putin stated "Artificial intelligence is the future, not only for Russia but for all humankind... Whoever becomes the leader in this sphere will become the ruler of the world". Putin also said it would be better to prevent any single actor achieving a monopoly, but that if Russia became the leader in AI, they would share their "technology with the rest of the world, like we are doing now with atomic and nuclear technology".

Russia is establishing a number of organizations devoted to the development of military AI. In March 2018, the Russian government released a 10-point AI agenda, which calls for the establishment of an AI and Big Data consortium, a Fund for Analytical Algorithms and Programs, a state-backed AI training and education program, a dedicated AI lab, and a National Center for Artificial Intelligence, among other initiatives. In addition, Russia recently created a defense research organization, roughly equivalent to DARPA, dedicated to autonomy and robotics called the Foundation for Advanced Studies, and initiated an annual conference on "Robotization of the Armed Forces of the Russian Federation."

The Russian military has been researching a number of AI applications, with a heavy emphasis on semiautonomous and autonomous vehicles. In an official statement on November 1, 2017, Viktor Bondarev, chairman of the Federation Council's Defense and Security Committee, stated that "artificial intelligence will be able to replace a soldier on the battlefield and a pilot in an aircraft cockpit" and later noted that "the day is nearing when vehicles will get artificial intelligence." Bondarev made these remarks in close proximity to the successful test of Nerehta, an crewless Russian ground vehicle that reportedly "outperformed existing [crewed] combat vehicles." Russia plans to use Nerehta as a research and development platform for AI and may one day deploy the system in combat, intelligence gathering, or logistics roles. Russia has also reportedly built a combat module for crewless ground vehicles that is capable of autonomous target identification—and, potentially, target engagement—and plans to develop a suite of AI-enabled autonomous systems.

In addition, the Russian military plans to incorporate AI into crewless aerial, naval, and undersea vehicles and is currently developing swarming capabilities. It is also exploring innovative uses of AI for remote sensing and electronic warfare, including adaptive frequency hopping, waveforms, and countermeasures. Russia has also made extensive use of AI technologies for domestic propaganda and surveillance, as well as for information operations directed against the United States and U.S. allies.

The Russian government has strongly rejected any ban on lethal autonomous weapon systems, suggesting that such a ban could be ignored.

China 

China is pursuing a strategic policy of military-civil fusion on AI for global technological supremacy. According to a February 2019 report by Gregory C. Allen of the Center for a New American Security, China's leadership – including paramount leader Xi Jinping – believes that being at the forefront in AI technology is critical to the future of global military and economic power competition. Chinese military officials have said that their goal is to incorporate commercial AI technology to "narrow the gap between the Chinese military and global advanced powers." The close ties between Silicon Valley and China, and the open nature of the American research community, has made the West's most advanced AI technology easily available to China; in addition, Chinese industry has numerous home-grown AI accomplishments of its own, such as Baidu passing a notable Chinese-language speech recognition capability benchmark in 2015. As of 2017, Beijing's roadmap aims to create a $150 billion AI industry by 2030. Before 2013, Chinese defense procurement was mainly restricted to a few conglomerates; however, as of 2017, China often sources sensitive emerging technology such as drones and artificial intelligence from private start-up companies. An October 2021 report by the Center for Security and Emerging Technology found that "Most of the [Chinese military]'s AI equipment suppliers are not state-owned defense enterprises, but private Chinese tech companies founded after 2010." The report estimated that Chinese military spending on AI exceeded $1.6 billion each year. The Japan Times reported in 2018 that annual private Chinese investment in AI is under $7 billion per year. AI startups in China received nearly half of total global investment in AI startups in 2017; the Chinese filed for nearly five times as many AI patents as did Americans.

China published a position paper in 2016 questioning the adequacy of existing international law to address the eventuality of fully autonomous weapons, becoming the first permanent member of the U. N. Security Council to broach the issue. In 2018, Xi called for greater international cooperation in basic AI research. Chinese officials have expressed concern that AI such as drones could lead to accidental war, especially in the absence of international norms. In 2019, former United States Secretary of Defense Mark Esper lashed out at China for selling drones capable of taking life with no human oversight.

United States 

In 2014, former Secretary of Defense Chuck Hagel posited the "Third Offset Strategy" that rapid advances in artificial intelligence will define the next generation of warfare. According to data science and analytics firm Govini, the U.S. Department of Defense increased investment in artificial intelligence, big data and cloud computing from $5.6 billion in 2011 to $7.4 billion in 2016. However, the civilian NSF budget for AI saw no increase in 2017. Japan Times reported in 2018 that the United States private investment is around $70 billion per year. The November 2019 'Interim Report' of the United States' National Security Commission on Artificial Intelligence confirmed that AI is critical to US technological military superiority.

The U.S. has many military AI combat programs, such as the Sea Hunter autonomous warship, which is designed to operate for extended periods at sea without a single crew member, and to even guide itself in and out of port. From 2017, a temporary US Department of Defense directive requires a human operator to be kept in the loop when it comes to the taking of human life by autonomous weapons systems. On October 31, 2019, the United States Department of Defense's Defense Innovation Board published the draft of a report recommending principles for the ethical use of artificial intelligence by the Department of Defense that would ensure a human operator would always be able to look into the 'black box' and understand the kill-chain process. However, a major concern is how the report will be implemented.

Project Maven is a Pentagon project involving using machine learning and engineering talent to distinguish people and objects in drone videos, apparently giving the government real-time battlefield command and control, and the ability to track, tag and spy on targets without human involvement. Initially the effort was led by Robert O. Work who was concerned about China's military use of the emerging technology.  Reportedly, Pentagon development stops short of acting as an AI weapons system capable of firing on self-designated targets. The project was established in a memo by the U.S. Deputy Secretary of Defense on 26 April 2017. Also known as the Algorithmic Warfare Cross Functional Team, it is, according to Lt. Gen. of the United States Air Force Jack Shanahan in November 2017, a project "designed to be that pilot project, that pathfinder, that spark that kindles the flame front of artificial intelligence across the rest of the [Defense] Department". Its chief, U.S. Marine Corps Col. Drew Cukor, said: "People and computers will work symbiotically to increase the ability of weapon systems to detect objects." At the second Defense One Tech Summit in July 2017, Cukor also said that the investment in a "deliberate workflow process" was funded by the Department [of Defense] through its "rapid acquisition authorities" for about "the next 36 months".

The Joint Artificial Intelligence Center (JAIC) (pronounced "jake") is an American organization on exploring the usage of AI (particularly edge computing), Network of Networks, and AI-enhanced communication, for use in actual combat. It is a subdivision of the United States Armed Forces and was created in June 2018. The organization's stated objective is to "transform the US Department of Defense by accelerating the delivery and adoption of AI to achieve mission impact at scale. The goal is to use AI to solve large and complex problem sets that span multiple combat systems; then, ensure the combat Systems and Components have real-time access to ever-improving libraries of data sets and tools."

United Kingdom 
In 2015, the UK government opposed a ban on lethal autonomous weapons, stating that "international humanitarian law already provides sufficient regulation for this area", but that all weapons employed by UK armed forces would be "under human oversight and control".

Israel 
Israel's Harpy anti-radar "fire and forget" drone is designed to be launched by ground troops, and autonomously fly over an area to find and destroy radar that fits pre-determined criteria. The application of artificial intelligence is also expected to be advanced in crewless ground systems and robotic vehicles such as the Guardium MK III and later versions. These robotic vehicles are used in border defense.

South Korea 
The South Korean Super aEgis II machine gun, unveiled in 2010, sees use both in South Korea and in the Middle East. It can identify, track, and destroy a moving target at a range of 4 km. While the technology can theoretically operate without human intervention, in practice safeguards are installed to require manual input. A South Korean manufacturer states, "Our weapons don't sleep, like humans must. They can see in the dark, like humans can't. Our technology therefore plugs the gaps in human capability", and they want to "get to a place where our software can discern whether a target is friend, foe, civilian or military".

European Union 
The European Parliament holds the position that humans must have oversight and decision-making power over lethal autonomous weapons. However, it is up to each member state of the European Union to determine their stance on the use of autonomous weapons and the mixed stances of the member states is perhaps the greatest hindrance to the European Union's ability to develop autonomous weapons. Some members such as France, Germany, Italy, and Sweden are developing lethal autonomous weapons. Some members remain undecided about the use of autonomous military weapons and Austria has even called to ban the use of such weapons.

Some EU member states have developed and are developing automated weapons. Germany has developed an active protection system, the Active Defense System, that can respond to a threat with complete autonomy in less than a millisecond. Italy plans to incorporate autonomous weapons systems into its future military plans.

Trends 
In 2014, AI specialist Steve Omohundro warned that "An autonomous weapons arms race is already taking place". According to Siemens, worldwide military spending on robotics was US$5.1 billion in 2010 and US$7.5 billion in 2015.

China became a top player in artificial intelligence research in the 2010s. According to the Financial Times, in 2016, for the first time, China published more AI papers than the entire European Union. When restricted to number of AI papers in the top 5% of cited papers, China overtook the United States in 2016 but lagged behind the European Union. 23% of the researchers presenting at the 2017 American Association for the Advancement of Artificial Intelligence (AAAI) conference were Chinese. Eric Schmidt, the former chairman of Alphabet, has predicted China will be the leading country in AI by 2025.

Proposals for international regulation 
The international regulation of autonomous weapons is an emerging issue for international law. AI arms control will likely require the institutionalization of new international norms embodied in effective technical specifications combined with active monitoring and informal diplomacy by communities of experts, together with a legal and political verification process. As early as 2007, scholars such as AI professor Noel Sharkey have warned of "an emerging arms race among the hi-tech nations to develop autonomous submarines, fighter jets, battleships and tanks that can find their own targets and apply violent force without the involvement of meaningful human decisions".

Miles Brundage of the University of Oxford has argued an AI arms race might be somewhat mitigated through diplomacy: "We saw in the various historical arms races that collaboration and dialog can pay dividends". Over a hundred experts signed an open letter in 2017 calling on the UN to address the issue of lethal autonomous weapons; however, at a November 2017 session of the UN Convention on Certain Conventional Weapons (CCW), diplomats could not agree even on how to define such weapons. The Indian ambassador and chair of the CCW stated that agreement on rules remained a distant prospect. As of 2019, 26 heads of state and 21 Nobel Peace Prize laureates have backed a ban on autonomous weapons. However, as of 2022, most major powers continue to oppose a ban on autonomous weapons.

Many experts believe attempts to completely ban killer robots are likely to fail, in part because detecting treaty violations would be extremely difficult. A 2017 report from Harvard's Belfer Center predicts that AI has the potential to be as transformative as nuclear weapons. The report further argues that "Preventing expanded military use of AI is likely impossible" and that "the more modest goal of safe and effective technology management must be pursued", such as banning the attaching of an AI dead man's switch to a nuclear arsenal.

Other reactions to autonomous weapons 
A 2015 open letter by the Future of Life Institute calling for the prohibition of lethal autonomous weapons systems has been signed by over 26,000 citizens, including physicist Stephen Hawking, Tesla magnate Elon Musk, Apple's Steve Wozniak and Twitter co-founder Jack Dorsey, and over 4,600 artificial intelligence researchers, including Stuart Russell, Bart Selman and Francesca Rossi. The Future of Life Institute has also released two fictional films, Slaughterbots (2017) and Slaughterbots - if human: kill() (2021), to warn the world about the risks of autonomous weapons and the urgent need for a ban, both of which went viral. 

Professor Noel Sharkey of the University of Sheffield has warned that autonomous weapons will inevitably fall into the hands of terrorist groups such as the Islamic State.

Disassociation 
Many Western tech companies are leery of being associated too closely with the U.S. military, for fear of losing access to China's market. Furthermore, some researchers, such as DeepMind's Demis Hassabis, are ideologically opposed to contributing to military work.

For example, in June 2018, company sources at Google said that top executive Diane Greene told staff that the company would not follow-up Project Maven after the current contract expired in March 2019.

See also
 A.I. Rising
 Arms race
 Artificial general intelligence
 Artificial intelligence
 Artificial Intelligence Cold War
 Cold War
 Ethics of artificial intelligence
 Existential risk from artificial general intelligence
 Lethal autonomous weapon
 Military robot
 Nuclear arms race
 Post–Cold War era
 Second Cold War
 Space Race
 Unmanned combat aerial vehicle
 Weak AI

References

Further reading
 Paul Scharre, "Killer Apps: The Real Dangers of an AI Arms Race", Foreign Affairs, vol. 98, no. 3 (May/June 2019), pp. 135–44. "Today's AI technologies are powerful but unreliable.  Rules-based systems cannot deal with circumstances their programmers did not anticipate.  Learning systems are limited by the data on which they were trained. AI failures have already led to tragedy. Advanced autopilot features in cars, although thesddsy perform well in some circumstances, have driven cars without warning into trucks, concrete barriers, and parked cars.  In the wrong situation, AI systems go from supersmart to superdumb in an instant.  When an enemy is trying to manipulate and hack an AI system, the risks are even greater."  (p. 140.)
The National Security Commission on Artificial Intelligence. (2019). Interim Report. Washington, DC: Author.

Artificial intelligence
Technological races
Computational neuroscience